The 2010–11 Regional Four Day Competition was the 45th domestic first-class cricket tournament held in the West Indies, it took place from 4 February 2011 – 9 April 2011. In addition to the seven Caribbean teams, the tournament also featured the England Lions. The tournament consisted of a round-robin that was followed by semi-finals where the top four teams competed. Although the Lions finished 3rd in the table, they were ineligible to play in the knock-out phase.

Jamaica won the tournament after beating Combined Campuses and Colleges in the final, it was their 4th tournament win in succession and their 11th overall. Jamaica had advanced to the final after a controversial semi-final against Trinidad and Tobago; although the match was drawn, Jamaica advanced because the previous result in the league between the two teams ended in their favour. The Trinidad and Tobago manager, Omar Khan, claimed that "there is still some misinterpretation concerning the rule pertaining to advancing to the finals....We find it very unfair."

Marlon Samuels of Jamaica finished as the tournament's highest run-scorer, he made 853 runs at an average of 65.61, including three centuries and a highest score of 250 not out. The leading wicket-taker in the competition was Ryan Austin of the Combined Campuses and Colleges, he took 44 wickets at an average of 19.15 with best innings figures of 7/134.

Points table

Semi finals

Final

Points allocation

Completed match

 Outright win – 12
 Loser if 1st Innings lead obtained – 4
 Loser if tie on 1st Innings – 3
 Loser if 1st Innings also lost – 0
 Tie – 8

Incomplete Match

 1st Innings lead – 6
 1st Innings loss – 3
 Tie on 1st innings – 4

Score Equal in a Drawn Match

 Team batting on the 4th innings – 8
 Team fielding on the 4th innings if that team has lead on 1st inning – 6
 If scores tied on 1st innings – 4
 If team has lost on 1st innings – 3

Abandoned Match

In the event of a match being abandoned without any play having taken place, or in the event of there being no 1st innings decision, three points each.

References

Regional Four Day Competition
2010–11 West Indian cricket season
Regional Four Day Competition seasons